Chagoyan is a rural locality (a selo) in Chagoyansky Selsoviet of Shimanovsky District, Amur Oblast, Russia. The population was 333 as of 2018. There are 13 streets.

Geography 
Chagoyan is located on the Zeya River, 45 km east of Shimanovsk (the district's administrative centre) by road. Malinovka is the nearest rural locality.

References 

Rural localities in Shimanovsky District